The railcar couplers or couplings listed, described, and depicted below are used worldwide on legacy and modern railways.  Compatible and similar designs are frequently referred to using widely differing make, brand, regional or nick names, which can make describing standard or typical designs confusing.  Dimensions and ratings noted in these articles are usually of nominal or typical components and systems, though standards and practices also vary widely with railway, region, and era.  Transition between incompatible coupler types may be accomplished using dual couplings, a coupling adapter or a barrier wagon.

Coupler types

 ABC coupler (Automatic Buffing Contact)
 Albert coupler
 bell and hook coupler
 BSI coupler (Bergische Stahl Industrie)
 buffers and chain coupler, also known as British, buffers and screw, English, EU, link and hook, UIC, or UK coupler
 center buffer and chains coupler
 Digital Automatic Coupler (DAC)
 GF coupler
 Henricot coupler
 H2C coupler
 Janney coupler, also known as AAR, APT, ARA, CB, center buffer, knuckle, MCB or tightlock coupler
 Johnston link and pin coupler
 link and pin coupler
 Miller coupler
 Norwegian coupler, also known as chopper or Jones coupler
 pin and cup coupler (WABCO N-Type)
 SA-3, also known as SovietAuto-3, AK69e, CA-3, Russian or Willison coupler
 Scharfenberg coupler, also known as Dellner, Schaku or Voith coupler
 While different Scharfenburg couplers may be mechanically compatible, they may be electrically incompatible. 
 Shibata coupler
 Ward coupler
 wedgelock coupler, also known as London or Tube coupler

Africa

Algeria 

 English, Russian couplers on  track
 English couplers on  gauge track

Angola 

 AAR couplers

Botswana 

 AAR couplers

Benin 

 CBC couplers

Burkina Faso and Côte d'Ivoire 

 English couplers

Cameroon 

 Russian couplers

Congo~Brazzaville 

 SA3 couplers

Democratic Republic of the Congo 

 AAR couplers

Egypt 

 English couplers on historic stock
 AAR couplerLinkss on modern stock

Eritrea 

 * CBC couplers

Ethiopia 

 AAR couplers

Gabon 

 Russian couplers

Ghana 

 Norwegian couplers on historic stock
 AAR couplers on modern stock

Kenya 
 AAR and Norwegian couplers on Narrow gauge railways
 AAR Alliance couplers on Standard gauge railways

Liberia 

 AAR couplers

Malawi 

 AAR couplers

Mali 

 like Senegal

Mauritania 

 AAR couplers
 SA3 couplers

Morocco 

 English couplers

Mozambique 

 AAR couplers

Nigeria 

  AAR couplers on modern  railways
 ABC couplers on legacy  railways
 ABC couplers on legacy Bauchi Light Railway  Narrow gauge railways

Senegal 

 English couplers on freight and passenger stock
 Norwegian couplers on Indian Stock

South Africa

 Buffers and chain coupler from 1859 to 1873.
 Johnston link-and-pin from 1873 to 1927 on Cape gauge, from 1906 on  narrow gauge in Natal.
 Bell-and-hook from 1902 on  narrow gauge in the Cape of Good Hope.
 AAR knuckle wide use from 1927 on Cape gauge. The first application of these couplers in what is now South Africa was in 1904 by the ultra-progressive Central South African Railways (CSAR) on their rolling stock for the "Limited Expresses" between Johannesburg and Pretoria.
 Willison from 1973 on  narrow gauge in the Cape Province.
WABCO N-Type from 1984 on 6M EMU rolling stock. Also used on class 8M EMU rolling stock built from 1988.
Scharfenberg from 2012 on Gautrain, from 2016 on new PRASA EM01 commuter stock.

Sudan 

 AAR couplers

Tanzania 

 Norwegian couplers on  track
 AAR couplers on  gauge track
 AAR couplers on  track.

Togo 

 Center buffer and side chain couplers
 Norwegian couplers on Indian Stock

Tunisia 

 English couplers

Uganda 
 narrow gauge : Norwegian couplers
 standard gauge : AAR couplers.

Asia

Bangladesh 

 AAR couplers on  Stock
 Norwegian couplers on  Stock

Cambodia 

 English couplers on older stock
 AAR couplers on newer stock

China 

 AAR couplers on passenger and freight stock
 Scharfenberg couplers on high speed (CRH) and subway trains

Hong Kong 

 BSI couplers on ex-MTR passenger units and maintenance stock
 Tightlock couplers on ex-KCR passenger units
 Dellner couplers on light rail stock
 AAR couplers on freight stock

India 

 English couplers on historic stock
 AAR couplers on modern stock
 Norwegian couplers on  track
 ABC couplers on narrow gauge stock
 Schaku Couplers in Suburban EMU and DEMU trains
 Scharfenberg couplers are also used in rapid transit transports like metros

Indonesia 

 English couplers on  historic stock of Nederlandsch-Indische Spoorweg Maatschappij (Dutch East Indies Railway Company) 
 Norwegian couplers on  gauge historic stock of The Dutch East Indies National Railway Company and the majority of the Dutch East Indies Private Railway and Tramway Companies
 AAR couplers and Shibata couplers on modern stock
 Scharfenberg couplers for the future Jakarta - Bandung high speed rail and Soekarno Hatta Airport skytrain.
 Shibata couplers (based on Scharfenberg couplers) for Jakarta LRT
 Dellner coupler for Greater Jakarta LRT

Iran 

 English couplers, Russian (C-AKv) combo couplers on freight and passenger stock
 Scharfenberg couplers on passenger stock

Iraq 

 English couplers on historic stock
 English, Russian (C-AKv) combo couplers on modern stock

Israel 

 English couplers on freight and passenger stock
 Scharfenberg couplers on passenger stock

Japan 

 English couplers on historic stock
 AAR couplers on freight and passenger stock
 Shibata couplers (based on Scharfenberg couplers) on passenger stock

North Korea 

 AAR couplers on standard gauge stock
 Reduced-size Janney couplers (AAR) on narrow gauge stock
 Scharfenberg couplers on Pyongyang Metro stock

South Korea 

 English couplers, link and pin couplers on historic stock
 AAR couplers on modern stock
 Shibata couplers (based on Scharfenberg couplers) on Subways and metro car

Malaysia 

 Norwegian couplers on historic stock
 AAR couplers on modern stock
 Scharfenberg couplers on ERL, LRT, MRT and Monorail.

Pakistan 

 English couplers on historic stock
 AAR couplers on modern stock

Philippines

 English couplers on Manila Railway Company (MRC) rolling stock, as well as historic Manila Railroad (MRR) stock before 1932.
 AAR couplers on MRR stock built after 1928 and on all Philippine National Railways narrow-gauge rolling stock.
Type E on historic stock and on the PNR 5000 class.
Type F interlocking couplers on upcoming PNR narrow-gauge flatcars.
Type H tightlock coupling on most PNR rolling stock starting with the 900 class.
 Link and pin couplers on the Hawaiian Philippine Company of Negros Island. Older Manila Railroad stock also use link and pin alongside English couplers.
 Scharfenberg couplers on the MRT Line 3.
 Shibata couplers on high-capacity rapid transit lines and on the North–South Commuter Railway.
 Type 10 on PNR 8800 class passenger trains for the PNR South Long Haul project.

Russia 

 Russian SA3 couplers on domestic stock (with side buffers on passenger coaches)
 English couplers on Euro Stock (exchanged on the border)
 Scharfenberg couplers on some passenger unit trains (Velaro, Desiro) and on all subway systems

Singapore 

 Scharfenberg couplers for the Mass Rapid Transit
 Bergische Stahl Industrie couplers for Bukit Panjang LRT
 Compact tight couplers by Japan Steel Works for Sengkang and Punggol LRT

Sri Lanka 

 Buffers and chain couplers, AAR couplers

Taiwan 

 AAR couplers for TRA rolling stock, including multiple units
 Shibata couplerx for THSR
 Tomlinson couplers for heavy-capacity Taipei Metro rolling stock
 Scharfenberg couplers for all other urban transit systems such as Kaohsiung MRT, Taoyuan Airport MRT, Taichung Metro and medium capacity Taipei Metro rolling stock
 Link and pin couplers for Alishan Forest Railway and Taiwan Sugar Railways

Thailand 

 AAR couplers on all SRT rolling stock
 Norwegian couplers on historic stock
 Scharfenberg couplers on mass-transit trains
 Wedgelock couplers, Ward couplers on London Underground stock
 Narrow gauge lines use a mixture of couplings.

Turkey 

 English couplers on older stock
 Scharfenberg couplers on passenger stock
 Russian couplers (C-AKv) on newer stock

Vietnam 

 AAR couplers on both  and  rolling stock

Europe

Austria 

 English couplers on standard gauge stock
 Scharfenberg couplers on passenger units
 Bosna couplers or Scharfenberg couplers on narrow gauge stock

Belgium 

 GF coupler on most multiple units
 Henricot semi automatic couplers on some EMU's 
 English couplers on locomotives, passenger carriages and goods waggons
 Scharfenberg couplers on high speed trains

Finland 

 English couplers (UIC) on passenger cars and most freight cars and on historical locomotives
 Russian SA3 couplers on Russian cars and some heavy-duty freight cars
 "Unilink couplers" (SA3 clone with UIC-style screw link) or "Vapiti" (SA3 clone with movable link arm for English couplers) couplers on the majority of locomotives; compatible with SA3 and English (UIC) center hook
 Scharfenberg couplers (some made by Dellner) on multiple unit passenger stock

France 

 English couplers on freight and passenger stock
 Scharfenberg couplers on passenger stock (multiple units and high speed trains only)
 Russian couplers on ore unit trains

Germany 

 English couplers on freight and passenger stock
 Scharfenberg couplers on passenger stock
 AK69es and C-AKv couplers on unit ore trains
 AK69e and SA3 couplers mixed in trains via Mukran ferry terminal
 Scharfenberg or central buffer couplers on narrow gauge stock

Greece 

 English couplers on freight and passenger stock
 Scharfenberg couplers on passenger stock
 Center buffer and side chains on narrow gauge stock

Hungary 

 English couplers on freight and passenger stock
 Scharfenberg couplers on multiple units (in some cases jointly with side buffers)
 BSI couplers with side buffers on BDVmot electric multiple units
 Link and pin on narrow gauge stock

Ireland

Italy 

 English couplers on standard gauge stock
 Scharfenberg couplers on some EMU/DMU and FS Class E.464

Netherlands 

 English couplers on freight and passenger stock
 BSI couplers, Scharfenberg couplers on passenger stock
 Russian couplers on ore unit trains

Norway 

 English couplers on freight and passenger stock
 Norwegian couplers on historic stock, narrow gauge only
 Scharfenberg couplers on passenger stock (multiple units)
 Russian SA3 couplers on unit ore trains (Ofoten Line)

Poland 

 English couplers on freight and passenger stock
 Scharfenberg couplers on passenger stock
 Russian couplers on unit ore trains and Russian interchange stock

Portugal 

 English couplers on freight and loco hauled passenger stock
 Scharfenberg couplers on multiple unit passenger stock

Romania 

 English couplers on freight and passenger stock
 Scharfenberg coupler on Siemens Desiro multiple units and some ex-German railbuses
 Link-and-pin couplers on narrow gauge stock

Russia 

 Russian SA3 couplers on domestic stock (with side buffers on passenger coaches)
 English couplers on Euro Stock (exchanged on the border)
 Scharfenberg couplers on some passenger unit trains (Velaro, Desiro) and on all subway systems

Spain 

 English couplers on freight and loco hauled passenger stock
 Scharfenberg couplers on multiple unit passenger stock
 AAR couplers on freight stock in narrow gauge
 BSI couplers on multiple unit passenger stock (only in Catalonian Railways: FGC)

Sweden 

 English couplers on freight and passenger stock
 Scharfenberg couplers on passenger stock
 Russian couplers on iron ore trains (Iron Ore Line)
 Variant of Norwegian couplers on historic (museum) narrow-gauge stock

Switzerland 

 English couplers on standard gauge stock
 GFV, Schwab, Scharfenberg or BSI couplers on passenger units
 AK69e couplers within BLS EW III sets
 GF, GFV or center buffer couplers/Balance lever couplings on meter and narrow gauge stock

Ukraine 

 SA3 couplers on  gauge rolling stock
 Combined SA3 coupler/English couplers on SUW 2000 gauge-changing coaches
 Scharfenberg couplers on some EMU trains
 Central buffer and chain couplers on narrow gauge rolling stock

United Kingdom 

 BSI couplers on most diesel multiple unit types, but also Dellner and Scharfenberg on some more recent types
 AAR Type H "Tightlock coupling" heads on 1970s to early 2000s electric multiple units
 Scharfenberg type heads (often Dellner) on most new electric multiple units, with a variety of electrical connection systems
 English coupler, AAR couplers on some freight stock, most locomotive-hauled passenger stock has a rd size Janney/Buckeye coupler
 Wedgelock couplers, Ward couplers on London Underground stock
 Narrow gauge lines use various couplings

Isle of Man

Caribbean

Cuba 

 AAR couplers

Jamaica 

 AAR couplers

Central America

Belize

Costa Rica

El Salvador

Guatemala

Honduras

Nicaragua

Panama 

 AAR couplers—Panama Canal Railway
 Link, pin and buffer—Panama canal mules

North America

Canada 

 AAR couplers on traditional stock
 Scharfenberg couplers, Wedgelock coupler, H2C couplers on transit stock
  size AAR couplers on the White Pass and Yukon Route

Mexico 

 AAR couplers on traditional stock
 Scharfenberg couplers on new passenger stock

United States 

 AAR couplers on mainline freight and passenger stock in the United States and Alaska
 Link Pin, Miller couplers on historic stock. Converted to AAR couplers 1893~1900 per Safety Appliance Act
 Older city systems have unique coupler designs for transit stock, e.g. H2C couplers on New York City Subway rolling stock
 Scharfenberg couplers on newer light rail and transit systems
 Pin Cup coupler on multiple unit transit stock
 Russian couplers on industrial and mining Stock

Alaska 

 AAR couplers on mainline freight and passenger stock in Alaska
  size AAR couplers on the White Pass and Yukon Route

Puerto Rico 

 Scharfenberg couplers on Tren Urbano

Oceania

Australia 

 English couplers, Norwegian couplers on historic stock
 AAR couplers on freight and passenger stock
 Scharfenberg couplers on passenger stock

New Zealand

 Norwegian couplers on legacy stock
 Janney couplers on modern freight & locomotives
 Scharfenberg couplers on modern EMUs

South America

Argentina 

 Small knuckle coupler with slot in knuckle for link and pin couplers on 
 Shibata semi-automatic couplers on EMUs made by Toshiba - Marubeni Corp. (1956 D.F. Sarmiento Railway, 1962 General Bartolomé Mitre Railway, 1973 General Urquiza Railway and 1983 General Roca Railway EMUs).
 Scharfenberg-type semi-automatic couplers (Dellner) on modern EMUs, DMUs and some passenger rolling stock In General San Martín Railway.
 Bell-and-hook couplers on various narrow-gauge tourist railways (Ferrocarril Pierda Baya, Austral Fueguino Railway and Económico Sud Railway).

Bolivia

Brazil 

 AAR couplers

Chile 

 AAR couplers on 
 English couplers (UIC)in coaches and locomotives bought from Spain
 Scharfenberg couplers in passenger units bought from Spain

Colombia

Ecuador

Paraguay 

 English couplers

Peru 
 AAR couplers

Suriname

Uruguay 

 English couplers (Main stock)
Janney Coupler (Brill 60 motorcar)

Venezuela

See also 

 Barrier vehicle
 Jane's World Railways, lists the coupler(s) used on any railway system
 Rail transport by country

References

External links

Couplers